The Democratic Liberal Congress (DLC) is a South African political party formed in 2016 by Patrick Pillay.

Pillay was a Minority Front councillor for fifteen years before infighting in that party after the death of longstanding leader Amichand Rajbansi led him to break away and form the DLC.

The party opposes affirmative action and land expropriation without compensation, and is in favour of austerity measures for government and simplifying business.

Election results

National elections

|-
! Election
! Total votes
! Share of vote
! Seats 
! +/–
! Government
|-
! 2019
| 10,767
| 0.06%
| 
| –
| 
|}

Provincial elections

! rowspan=2 | Election
! colspan=2 | Eastern Cape
! colspan=2 | Free State
! colspan=2 | Gauteng
! colspan=2 | Kwazulu-Natal
! colspan=2 | Limpopo
! colspan=2 | Mpumalanga
! colspan=2 | North-West
! colspan=2 | Northern Cape
! colspan=2 | Western Cape
|-
! % !! Seats
! % !! Seats
! % !! Seats
! % !! Seats
! % !! Seats
! % !! Seats
! % !! Seats
! % !! Seats
! % !! Seats
|-
! 2019
| - || -
| - || -
| - || -
| 0.38% || 0/80
| - || -
| - || -
| - || -
| - || -
| - || -
|}

Municipal elections

|-
! Election
! Votes
! %
|-
! 2016
| 11,895
| 0.03%
|-
! 2021
| 8,178
| 0.03%
|-
|}

References

2016 establishments in South Africa
Liberal parties in South Africa
Political parties established in 2016
Political parties in South Africa